Gerald Orren Young (May 19, 1930 – June 6, 1990) was a United States Air Force officer and a recipient of the U.S. military's highest decoration—the Medal of Honor—for his actions in the Vietnam War.

Biography
Gerald Young was born on May 19, 1930, in Chicago, Illinois. He served in the Navy from 1947 to 1952, and from 1955 to 1956, when he transferred to the Air Force. During the Vietnam War he served as a captain in the 37th Aerospace Rescue and Recovery Squadron, a helicopter unit operating out of Da Nang Air Force Base, Republic of Vietnam.

On the night of November 8–9, 1967, Young's aircraft was one of two HH-3E Jolly Green Giant helicopters sent to extract five survivors of a U.S. Army Special Forces reconnaissance team in Laos. The extraction site was known to be hot, surrounded by a well-disciplined, crack North Vietnamese Army (NVA) battalion. Two helicopters had already been shot down and destroyed in the area. Illuminated by a C-130 Hercules dropping LUU-2 parachute flares, "Jolly 29" made a pickup of three survivors before being driven off by intense enemy fire. Young, piloting "Jolly 26", then attempted to pick up the remaining two survivors, both now wounded. Fighting was intense both in the air and on the ground. A U.S. Air Force para-rescueman aboard Young's aircraft, Larry W. Maysey, jumped from the helicopter and ran down a steep slope, rescuing the two remaining men. "Jolly 26" was now being hit with small arms fire. Just after Maysey had helped both survivors safely on board, a rocket-propelled grenade (RPG) struck the number one engine, fatally crippling the craft. The engine exploded, inverting the helicopter, which rolled and skidded down a deep ravine and burst into flames; Young and one other man survived the crash and escaped the burning wreckage. Despite severe wounds, Young evaded capture for seventeen hours until being rescued later that day. As a result of Captain Young's efforts, the other survivor of the crash was ultimately rescued and the bodies of those servicemembers who perished were also recovered.
For these actions, he was awarded the Medal of Honor. The para-rescueman, Maysey, was posthumously awarded the Air Force Cross.

Young reached the rank of lieutenant colonel before leaving the Air Force in 1980. Aged 60 at his death, he was buried at Arlington National Cemetery, in Arlington, Virginia.

Awards and decorations
His decorations include the following:
  Command pilot

Medal of Honor citation
For conspicuous gallantry and intrepidity at the risk of his life above and beyond the call of duty. Capt. Young distinguished himself while serving as a helicopter rescue crew commander. Capt. Young was flying escort for another helicopter attempting the night rescue of an Army ground reconnaissance team in imminent danger of death or capture. Previous attempts had resulted in the loss of 2 helicopters to hostile ground fire. The endangered team was positioned on the side of a steep slope which required unusual airmanship on the part of Capt. Young to effect pickup. Heavy automatic weapons fire from the surrounding enemy severely damaged 1 rescue helicopter, but it was able to extract 3 of the team. The commander of this aircraft recommended to Capt. Young that further rescue attempts be abandoned because it was not possible to suppress the concentrated fire from enemy automatic weapons. With full knowledge of the danger involved, and the fact that supporting helicopter gunships were low on fuel and ordnance, Capt. Young hovered under intense fire until the remaining survivors were aboard. As he maneuvered the aircraft for takeoff, the enemy appeared at point-blank range and raked the aircraft with automatic weapons fire. The aircraft crashed, inverted, and burst into flames. Capt. Young escaped through a window of the burning aircraft. Disregarding serious burns, Capt. Young aided one of the wounded men and attempted to lead the hostile forces away from his position. Later, despite intense pain from his burns, he declined to accept rescue because he had observed hostile forces setting up automatic weapons positions to entrap any rescue aircraft. For more than 17 hours he evaded the enemy until rescue aircraft could be brought into the area. Through his extraordinary heroism, aggressiveness, and concern for his fellow man, Capt. Young reflected the highest credit upon himself, the U.S. Air Force, and the Armed Forces of his country.

See also

 List of Medal of Honor recipients for the Vietnam War
 Young's Park on Guemes Island, Washington is named after him.

References

External links
  www.billiongraves.com Headstone picture
 
 

1930 births
1990 deaths
United States Air Force Medal of Honor recipients
United States Air Force personnel of the Vietnam War
Aviators from Illinois
Burials at Arlington National Cemetery
Recipients of the Air Medal
Recipients of the Distinguished Flying Cross (United States)
Shot-down aviators
United States Air Force colonels
Vietnam War recipients of the Medal of Honor
Military personnel from Illinois
American Vietnam War pilots